State Route 41 (SR 41) is a  state highway in the southwestern part of the U.S. state of Alabama. The southern terminus of the highway is at the Florida state line near Dixonville in Escambia County, where the roadway continues as Florida State Road 87 (SR 87). The northern terminus of the highway is at its intersection with SR 14 at Selma.

Route description
SR 41 is a continuation of Florida State Road 87, leading into Alabama from the Gulf coast beaches and Milton. SR 41 begins its route along a two-lane road south of the small town of Dixonville. North of Dixonville, SR 41 intersects U.S. Route 29 (US 29) south of Brewton. Northbound SR 41 and southbound US 29 share a brief wrong-way concurrency as they head into Brewton. This concurrency ends when the two highways intersect US 31 in Brewton, and US 29 joins US 31.

Just after entering Conecuh County, SR 41 intersects I-65, offering motorists a direct route from the Florida Panhandle to Montgomery and Birmingham. SR 41 continues its northward trajectory as it enters Monroe County. At Repton, the highway turns west as it joins US 84.

Near Monroeville, the highway once again turns north as it leaves US 84 and begins a brief concurrency with SR 21. SR 41 continues to the north until it reaches Camden, the county seat of Wilcox County. From there, the highway turns slightly to the northeast until it reaches its terminus east of Selma, at SR 14.

History

SR 41 was formed in 1957. Until then, the route was designated as SR 93 between the Florida state line and Camden. From Camden to Selma, the route was designated as SR 43.

Major intersections

See also

References

041
Transportation in Escambia County, Alabama
Transportation in Conecuh County, Alabama
Transportation in Monroe County, Alabama
Transportation in Wilcox County, Alabama
Transportation in Dallas County, Alabama